Greatest Hits Live may refer to:

Music albums
Greatest Hits Live (2 Plus 1 album)
Greatest Hits Live (April Wine album)
Greatest Hits Live 2003, by April Wine
Greatest Hits Live (Diana Ross album)
Greatest Hits Live (Diesel album)
Greatest Hits Live (Earth, Wind & Fire album)
Greatest Hits Live! (Lita Ford album)
Greatest Hits Live (Ace Frehley album)
Greatest Hits Live! (Jaki Graham album)
Greatest Hits Live (Hall & Oates album)
Greatest Hits/Live, by Heart
Greatest Hits Live (The Jets album)
Greatest Hits Live (Journey album)
Greatest Hits – Live (Don McLean album)
Greatest Hits Live (Ramones album)
Greatest Hits Live (Roy Orbison album)
Greatest Hits Live! (Sammy Hagar album)
Greatest Hits Live! (Saxon album)
Greatest Hits Live (Boz Scaggs album)
Greatest Hits Live (Carly Simon album)
Greatest Hits Live (Sham 69 album),
Greatest Hits Live (Starz album)
Greatest Hits Live (Stiff Little Fingers album)
Greatest Hits Live (Strawbs album)
Greatest Hits Live (Tina Arena album)
Greatest Hits Live (War album)
Greatest Hits Live (The Who album)
Greatest Hits Live (Yes album)
The Greatest Hits Live at Wembley Arena, by Atomic Kitten
Greatest Hits: Live in Amsterdam, The Supremes album
Greatest Hits: Live at the House of Blues, DJ Quick album
Greatest Hits Live: The Encore Collection, Eddie Money album
Greatest Hits Live: Vancouver 1986, Donovan album

Tours
Greatest Hits Live! (tour), a concert tour by The Saturdays
Greatest Hits Live (Take That), a concert tour by Take That

Other albums
In Concert (King Biscuit), America album
King Biscuit Flower Hour: Bachman–Turner Overdrive
King Biscuit Flower Hour: Greatest Hits Live, Emerson, Lake & Palmer album

See also
List of greatest hits albums
List of albums titled Live